Physically bridging Europe and Asia, Turkey is a secular country that has pursued a Western-oriented foreign policy. To this end, Turkey uses its global diplomatic network—the fourth most extensive—of 246 diplomatic and consular missions.

Since the Cold War, Turkey's most important ally has been the United States, which shared Turkey's interest in containing Soviet expansion. In support of the United States, Turkey contributed personnel to the UN forces in the Korean War (1950–1953), joined NATO in 1952, recognized Israel in 1948 and has cooperated closely with it.

Turkey's alliance with Israel during the Arab–Israeli conflict strained its relations with the Arab world, and Iran, and subsequently led to overt Syrian support for Palestinian and Armenian terrorist operations against Turkish diplomats abroad until 1990.

History
Historically, the Foreign relations of the Ottoman Empire and later Turkey balanced regional and global powers off against one another, forming alliances that best protected the interests of the incumbent regime. The Soviet Union played a major role in supplying weapons to and financing Mustafa Kemal Atatürk's faction during the Turkish War of Independence but Turkey's followed a course of relative international isolation during the period of Atatürk's Reforms in 1920s and 1930s. International conferences gave Turkey full control of the strategic straits linking the Black Sea and the Mediterranean, through the Treaty of Lausanne in 1923 and the Montreux Convention of 1936.

In the late 1930s Nazi Germany made a major effort to promote anti-Soviet propaganda in Turkey and exerted economic pressure. Britain and France, eager to outmaneuver Germany, negotiated a tripartite treaty in 1939. They gave Turkey a line of credit to purchase war materials from the West and a loan to facilitate the purchase of commodities.  Afraid of threats from Germany and Russia, Turkey maintained neutrality. It sold chrome—an important war material—to both sides.  It was clear by 1944 that Germany would be defeated and the chrome sales to Germany stopped.

After 1945

After World War II Turkey sought closer relations with Western powers. It became a founding member of the United Nations in 1945, a recipient of Marshall Plan aid and a member of North Atlantic Treaty Organization in 1952. European Union–Turkey relations warmed during the Cold War period and the post-Cold War period has seen a diversification of relations, with Turkey, at various moments, seeking to strengthen its regional presence in the Balkans, the Middle East and the Caucasus, as well as taking steps toward EU membership.

Under the AKP government (2003–), Turkey's economy has grown rapidly and the country's influence has grown in the Middle East based on a strategic depth doctrine, also called Neo-Ottomanism. Debate on Turkey's foreign relations is controversial both within Turkey itself and outside the country. In the West, there is a divide between those who are worried about Turkey's perceived movement away from the West toward a less democratic, more Islamic or more pro-Russian and pro-Chinese orientation and those who do not see Turkey's changing political structure, growing regional power and relations with Russia as a threat.

Bilateral relations
Despite being one of the first countries to recognize Armenia's independence, Turkey has never established formal diplomatic relations with Armenia. Turkey formerly had diplomatic relations with Cyprus, Taiwan and Syria.

Multilateral

Africa
There has been a revival in Turkey's relation with Africa after 1998 and civil society is the leading factor in this process. Initially this revival came as a passive attempt, but after 2005 it became an offensive interest in developing relations with the continent. The recent Turkey–Africa Cooperation Summit in 2008 marks the latest stage in Turkey's keen interest in developing relations with Africa, and should be seen as a turning point. Turkey since its involvement in Somalia in 2011, is eager to be considered as a political actor in the continent.

Northern Africa

Sub–Saharan Africa
Since 2008, Turkey has prioritized friendly relations with Africa partly to build friendly and conflict–free relations, which was not available in the hostile atmosphere in its neighborhood. Capitalizing on a strong sentiment of fellowship among Turkish people towards Africans, economic and diplomatic relations with Africa flourished: Foreign trade between sub-Saharan Africa and Turkey increased from US$581 million in 1998 to US$5.08 billion in 2015.

Dating back to 1800, Turkey's relations with sub-Saharan Africa flourished from the 1860s—when the Ottoman Empire started sending trained imams to the region—until 1885 when other European colonial powers blocked Ottoman influence. Relations were restored in the 1950s, and gained momentum when Emperor Haile Selassie visited Turkey in March 1967 and December 1969.

Since 2008, Turkey has contributed to the region through participation in peacekeeping missions, including the UN Mission in Ivory Coast (UNOC), the Democratic Republic of the Congo, Liberia, Central African Republic, Chad.

Turkey has also dramatically increased financial aid to the region, providing a total of US$6.38 billion to the region just between 2006 and 2011 including the 2011 donation of US$200 million to fight the famine in East Africa.

Americas

Southern Cone

North America

Caribbean

Central America

Latin America, rest of

Asia and Oceania

Turkic states

Asia-Pacific

Western Asia

Europe

International organizations

ASEAN (Sectoral Dialogue Partner)
ACD
ADB
Australia Group
BIS
Black Sea Naval Force
BSEC
CE
Community of Portuguese Language Countries (observer)
Developing-8
EBRD
G20
IAEA
IBRD
International Energy Agency
NATO
NEA
NSG
OECD
OIC
OSCE
Turkic Council
TURKPA
TÜRKSOY
UfM

Turkey is a founding member of the UN (1945), the Organisation for Economic Co-operation and Development (1961), the Organisation of Islamic Cooperation (1969), the Organization for Security and Co-operation in Europe (OSCE) (1973), and the G20 industrial nations (1999). Turkey is a member state of the Council of Europe (1949) and NATO (1952) as well as being in full accession negotiations with the European Union since 2005, having been an associate member since 1963. Turkey was also an associate member of the Western European Union from 1992 to 2011, and signed the E.U. Customs Union agreement in 1995.

Turkey entered NATO in 1952 and serves as the organization's vital eastern anchor, controlling the Turkish Straits which lead from the Black Sea to the Mediterranean and sharing a border with Syria, Iraq, and Iran. A NATO headquarters is located in İzmir, and the United States has maintained air forces at the Incirlik Air Base in the province of Adana.

Turkey is also a member of the World Trade Organization (WTO) since 1995. It has signed free trade agreements with the European Free Trade Association (EFTA), Israel, and many other countries. In 1992, Turkey and 10 other regional nations formed the BSEC to expand regional trade and economic cooperation. In 2017, ASEAN-Turkey Sectoral Dialogue Partnership was recognized by the 50th ASEAN Foreign Ministers' Meeting in Manila, Philippines.

See also

 Turkish Modern Relations
 List of diplomatic missions in Turkey
 List of diplomatic missions of Turkey
 Turkey's membership of international organizations
 Visa requirements for Turkish citizens
 Uniting for Consensus
 Middle power

References

Further reading

European Union–Turkey relations
 Aybet, Gülnur. Turkey's Foreign Policy and Its Implications for the West: A Turkish Perspective. London: Royal United Services Institute for Defence Studies, 1994.
 Aydin-Duzgit, Senem and Keyman, Fuat, "EU–Turkey Relations and the Stagnation of Turkish Democracy," IAI/IPC, Global Turkey in Europe, Working Paper 2 (2012).
 Barchard, David. "Turkey and the West." (Chatham House Papers, No. 27, published for the Royal Institute of International Affairs.) London: Routledge and Kegan Paul, 1985.
 Cakir, A.E. (ed.), Fifty Years of EU–Turkey Relations (Oxon: Routledge, 2011).
 Dixon, Jeffrey C., "Turkey, Islam and the EU," Contexts, 8.4 (2009).
 Engert, Stefan, EU Enlargement and Socialization: Turkey and Cyprus (New York: Routledge, 2010).
 Esfahani, Hadi Salehi and Ceviker-Gurakar, Esra, "Fading Attraction: Turkey's Shifting Relationship with the European Union," The Quarterly Review of Economics and Finance, 53.4 (November 2013).
 Fuller, Graham E. Turkey's New Geopolitics: From the Balkans to Western China. (A Rand Study.) Boulder, Colorado: Westview Press, 1993.
 Gocek, Fatma Muge. East Encounters West: France and the Ottoman Empire in the 18th Century. New York: Oxford University Press, 1987.
 Goffman, Daniel. Izmir and the Levantine World, 1550–1650. Seattle: University of Washington Press, 1990.
 International Crisis Group, "Turkey and Europe: The Way Ahead," Europe Report No. 184 (17 August 2007).
 Kramer, Heinz, A Changing Turkey: A Challenge to Europe and the US (Washington, DC: Brookings Institution Press, 2000).
 Kubicek, Paul, "Turkey's Inclusion in the Atlantic Community: Looking Back, Looking Forward," Turkish Studies, 9.1 (March 2008).
 Kuniholm, Bruce R. "Turkey and the West," Foreign Affairs, 70, No. 2, Spring 1991, pp. 34–48.
 Kuniholm, Bruce R., "Turkey and NATO," in Kaplan, L., Clawson, R. and Luraghi, R. (eds.), NATO and the Mediterranean (Wilmington: Scholarly Resources, 1985).
 McGhee, George C. "Turkey Joins the West." Foreign Affairs, July 1954, pp. 617–30.
 Oguzlu, Tarik, "Turkey and Europeanization of Foreign Policy?" Political Science Quarterly, 125.4 (Winter 2010/2011).
 Pierini, Marc, "Options for the EU–Turkey Relationship," Carnegie Europe, 3 May 2019.
 Pierini, Marc and Ulgen, Sinan, "A Moment of Opportunity in the EU–Turkey Relationship," Carnegie Europe (Brussels, December 2014).
 Reuther, Helmut (ed.). Deutschlands Aussenpolitik seit 1955. With a contribution by Franz von Cancig, "Die Türkei, Griechenland und die deutsche Aussenpolitik." Stuttgart-Degerloch: Seewald Verlag, 1965.
 Steinbach, Udo. "Turkey-ECC Relations: Cultural Dimension." pp. 13–24 in Erol Manisali, ed., Turkey's Place in Europe: Economic, Political, and Cultural Dimensions. Istanbul: Ucer, 1990.
 Tocci, Nathalie, "New Doubts and Uncertainties in Turkey–EU Relations," Paper, Centre for European Policy Studies (October 2000).
 Narbone, Luigi and Tocci, Nathalie, "Running Around in Circles? The Cyclical Relationship Between Turkey and the European Union," in Verney, S. and Infantis, K. (eds.), Turkey's Road to European Union Membership: National Identity and Political Change (London: Routledge, 2009).

Greece–Turkey relations
 "Der Zypern-Konflikt, eine Bewahrungsprobe westlicher Friedensordnung." Europa-Archiv, 1964, pp. 713–26.
 Bahcheli, Tozun. Greek–Turkish Relations since 1955. Boulder, Colorado: Westview Press, 1990.
 Balci, Ali, "Foreign Policy as Politicking in the Sarikiz Coup Plot: Cyprus Between the Coup Plotters and the JDP," Middle East Critique, 21.2 (Summer 2012).
 Brus, Marcel et al., "A Promise to Keep: Time to End the International Isolation of the Turkish Cypriots," TESEV, Foreign Policy Analysis Series, No. 7 (Istanbul, June 2008).
 Couloumbis, Theodore A. The United States, Greece, and Turkey: The Troubled Triangle. New York: Praeger, 1983.
 Engert, Stefan, EU Enlargement and Socialization: Turkey and Cyprus (New York: Routledge, 2010).
 Ertekün, Necati M. The Cyprus Dispute and the Birth of the Turkish Republic of Northern Cyprus. Nicosia, Northern Cyprus: Rustem, 1984.
 International Crisis Group, "Reunifying Cyprus: The Best Chance Yet," Europe Report No. 194 (23 June 2008).
 International Crisis Group, "The Cyprus Stalemate: What Next?" Europe Report No. 171 (8 March 2006).
 Migdalovitz, Carol, "Cyprus: Status of U.N. Negotiations and Related Issues," CRS Report (Washington, DC, 20 July 2007).
 Ozcan, Gencer, "The Military and the Making of Foreign Policy in Turkey," in Kirisci, K. and Rubin, B. (eds.), Turkey in World Politics: An Emerging Multiregional Power (London: Lynne Rienner, 2001).
 Pipinelis, Panayotis. "The Greco-Turkish Feud Revived." Foreign Affairs, January 1959, pp. 306–16.
 Psomiades, Harry J. The Eastern Question: The Last Phase. A Study in Greek Turkish Diplomacy. Salonika (Greece): Institute for Balkan Studies, 1968.
 Qicek, Kemal. "Living Together: Muslim-Christian Relations in 18th-Century Cyprus as Reflected by the Shari'a Court Record," Islam and Christian-Muslim Relations [Birmingham, United Kingdom], 4, No. 1, 1993.
 Sozen, Ahmet, "The Cyprus Challenge in Turkey–EU Relations: Heading Towards the Defining Moment?" in Cengiz, F. and Hoffmann, L. (eds.), Turkey and the European Union: Facing New Challenges and Opportunities (London: Routledge, 2014).
 Stearns, Monteagle. Entangled Allies: US Policy toward Greece, Turkey, and Cyprus. New York: Council on Foreign Relations Press, 1992.
 Turkeş, Alpaslan. Dış Politikamız ve Kıbrıs (Our Foreign Policy and Cyprus). Istanbul: Publication of the Istanbul Cypriote-Turkish Society, 1966.

Middle East–Turkey relations
 Ayoob, Mohammed, "Beyond the Democratic Wave in the Arab World: The Middle East's Turko-Persian Future," Insight Turkey, 13.2 (2011).
 Bank, André and Karadag, Roy, "The 'Ankara Moment': The Politics of Turkey's Regional Power in the Middle East," Third World Quarterly, 34.2 (2013).
 Bengio, Ofra and Ozcan, Gencer, "Old Grievances, New Fears: Arab Perceptions of Turkey and Its Alignment with Israel," Middle Eastern Studies, 37.2 (April 2001).
 Bolukbasi, Suha. "Turkey, Syria, Iraq, and the Euphrates Dam," Journal of South Asian and Middle Eastern Studies, 16, No. 4, June 1993, pp. 9–32.
 Brummett, Palmira. Ottoman Seapower and Levantine Diplomacy in the Age of Discovery. Albany: State University of New York Press, 1994.
 Burton, J.A. "Relations Between the Khanate of Bukhara and Ottoman Turkey, 1558–1702," International Journal of Turkish Studies, 5, 1990–91, pp. 83–103.
 Fuller, Graham, The New Turkish Republic: Turkey as a Pivotal State in the Muslim World (Washington, DC: United States Institute of Peace, 2008).
 Haddad, Benjamin, "Time for Turkey and Europe to Face Reality: Turkey Is Not Going to Join the EU. And That Is OK," Foreign Policy, 23 May 3016.
 Nafi, Basheer M., "The Arabs and Modern Turkey: A Century of Changing Perceptions," Insight Turkey, 11.1 (2009).
 Hale, William M. "Turkey, the Middle East, and the Gulf Crisis," International Affairs [London], 68, No. 2, Spring 1992, pp. 679–692.
 International Crisis Group, "Turkey and the Middle East: Ambitions and Constraints," Europe Report No. 203 (7 April 2010).
 Jennings, Ronald C. Christians and Muslims in Ottoman Cyprus and the Mediterranean World, 1571–1640. New York: New York University Press, 1993.
 Karpat, Kemal H., "Turkish and Arab-Israeli Relations," in Karpat, K. (ed.), Turkey's Foreign Policy in Transition (Leiden: E. J. Brill, 1975).
 Kirisci, Kemal, Tocci, Nathalie, and Walker, Joshua, "A Neighborhood Rediscovered: Turkey's Transatlantic Value in the Middle East," The German Marshall Fund of the United States, Paper Series (Washington, DC, 2010).
 Kirisci, Kemal, "The EU, Turkey and the Arab Spring: Challenges and Opportunities for Regional Integration," IAI/IPC, Global Turkey in Europe, Working Paper 1 (2012).
 Kirisci, Kemal and Winrow, Gareth M., The Kurdish Question and Turkey: An Example of a Trans-State Ethnic Conflict (London: Frank Cass, 1997).
 Levy, Aviador. The Sephardim in the Ottoman Empire. Princeton: Darwin Press and Washington: Institute of Turkish Studies, 1992.
 Robins, Philip. Turkey and the Middle East. London: Royal Institute of International Affairs and New York: Council on Foreign Relations Press, 1991.
 Sayari, Sabri. "Turkey: The Changing European Security Environment and the Gulf Crisis," Middle East Journal, 46, No. 1, Winter 1992, pp. 9–21.
 Shaw, Stanford. The Jews of the Ottoman Emire and Modern Turkey. New York: New York University Press, 1991.

Russia–Turkey relations and the Turkish Straits 
 "The Turkish Straits in the Light of Recent Turkish-Soviet Russian Correspondence." American Journal of International Law, October 1947, pp. 727–47.
 Bayazit, Vural. "Black Sea and Mediterranean Challenges for the Turkish Navy," NATO's Sixteen Nations [Brussels], 39, January 1994, pp. 67–69.
 DeLuca, Anthony R. The Great Power Rivalry at the Turkish Straits: The Montreux Conference and the Convention of 1936. (East European Monographs.) Boulder, Colorado: Westview Press, 1981.
 Dranov, B. Chernomorskie Prolivy-Mezhdunarodno-pravovoi rezhim (The Black Sea Straits-International-legal regime). Moscow: Yurid, izd-vo, 1948.
 Edmonds, Martin, and John Skitt. "Current Soviet Maritime Strategy and NATO." International Affairs, January 1969, pp. 28–43.
 Eren, Nuri. "Die türkisch-sowjetischen Beziehungen." Europa-Archiv, September 1965, pp. 337–48.
 Erkin, Feridun Cerna. Les Relations Turco-Soviétiques et la Question des Detroits. Ankara: Banur Matbaas1, 1968.
 Esmer, Ahmed Şükrü. "The Straits: Crux of World Politics." Foreign Affairs, January 1947, pp. 290–302.
 Fernau, Friedrich-Wilhelm. "Nachbarschaft am Schwarzen Meer. Wendepunkte in den türkisch-sowjetischen Beziehungen." Europa-Archiv, September 1967, pp. 613–20.
 Howard, Harry N. "The United States and the Question of the Turkish Straits." Middle East Journal, January 1947, pp. 59–72.
 Hurewitz, J. C. The Background of Russia's Claims to the Turkish Straits. Ankara: Turk Tarih Kurumu Basimevi, 1964.
 Imhoff, Christoph von. Duell in Mittelmeer: Moskau greift nach dem Nahen und Mittleren Osten. Freiburg i. Br.: Rombach, 1968.
 Rohn, Peter H. "Turkish Treaties in Global Perspective." Turkish Yearbook of International Relations, 1965, pp. n9-60.
 Routh, D. A. "The Montreux Convention Regarding the Regime of the Black Sea Straits." Survey of International Affairs, 1936. London: Oxford University Press, 1937.
 Sadak, Necmeddin. "Turkey Faces the Soviets." Foreign Affairs, April 1949, pp. 449–461.
 Shotwell, James T., and Francis Deak. Turkey at the Straits: A Short History. New York: Macmillan, 1940.
 Yanik, Lerna. "Allies or Partners An Appraisal of Turkey's Ties to Russia 1991–2007", East European Quarterly 41#3 (2007), pp. 349–370.

Turkey–Turkic world relations
 Contessi, Nicola P. "Turkey and the Shanghai Cooperation Organization: Common values, economics or pure geopolitics?" in Emre Erşen, Seçkin Köstem, eds. Turkey's Pivot to Eurasia. Geopolitics and Foreign Policy in a Changing World Order, (Routledge, 2019), pp. 93–110.
 Gokalp, Ziya. The Principles of Turkism. Trans., Robert Devereux. Leiden, Netherlands: E.J. Brill, 1968.
 Kubilay Yado Arin. The AKP's Foreign Policy, Turkey's Reorientation from the West to the East? (Wissenschaftlicher Verlag Berlin, 2013).
 Landau, Jacob M. Pan-Turkism in Turkey: A Study of Irredentism. Hamden, Connecticut: Archon Books, 1981.
 Robins, Philip. "Between Sentiment and Self-interest: Turkey's Policy toward Azerbaijan and the Central Asian States," Middle East Journal, 47, No. 4, Autumn 1993, pp. 593–610.

Turkey–United States relations
 Armaoglu, Fahir H. "Turkey and the United States: A New Alliance." The Turkish Yearbook of International Relations, 1965, pp. 1–15.
 Aybet, Gülnur. Turkey's Foreign Policy and Its Implications for the West: A Turkish Perspective. London: Royal United Services Institute for Defence Studies, 1994.
 Barkey, Henri. "Turkish-American Relations in the Post-War Era: An Alliance of Convenience," Orient [Leverkusen, Germany], 33, No. 3, 1992, pp. 447–464.
 Barlas, Dilek, and Şuhnaz Yilmaz. "Managing the transition from Pax Britannica to Pax Americana: Turkey's relations with Britain and the US in a turbulent era (1929–47)." Turkish Studies (2016): pp. 1–25.
 Bolukbasi, Suha. The Superpowers and the Third World: Turkish–American Relations and Cyprus. Lanham, Maryland: University Press of America, 1988.
 Couloumbis, Theodore A. The United States, Greece, and Turkey: The Troubled Triangle. New York: Praeger, 1983.
 Yilmaz, Şuhnaz. Turkish-American Relations, 1800–1952: Between the Stars, Stripes and the Crescent (Routledge, 2015).

Foreign relations (1923–1945)
 "Türk Dış Politikasına Yon Veren Etkenler (1923–1968)" ("Controlling Factors of Turkish Foreign Policy, 1923–1968"). Siyasal Bilgiler Fakültesi Dergisi (Review of the Political Science Faculty), 23 (1968).
 Ataöv, Türkkaya. "Turkish Foreign Policy: 1923–1938." Turkish Yearbook of International Relations, 1961, pp. 103–42.
 Ataöv, Türkkaya. Turkish Foreign Policy, 1939–1945. Ankara: Publication of the Faculty of Political Sciences of the University of Ankara, 1965.
 Hale, William. Turkish Foreign Policy Since 1774 (Routledge, 2012).
 Howard, Harry N. The Partition of Turkey: A Diplomatic History, 1913–1923. New York: Ferig, 1966.
 Kohn, Hans. "Ten Years of the Turkish Republic." Foreign Affairs, October 1933, pp. 141–155.
 Sousa, Nasim. The Capitulatory Regime of Turkey: Its History, Origin, and Nature. Baltimore: Johns Hopkins Press, 1957.
 Vere-Hodge, Edward Reginald. Turkish Foreign Policy, 1918–1948. Ambilly Annemasse: Imprimerie Franco-Suisse, 1950.

Foreign relations (1945–2002)
 Abramowitz, Morton. "Dateline Ankara: Turkey after Özal," Foreign Policy, No. 91, 1993, pp. 164–81.
 Balci, Ali and Mis, Nebi, "Turkey's Role in the Alliance of Civilizations: A New Perspective in Turkish Foreign Policy?" Turkish Studies, 9.3 (September 2008).
 Batu, Hamit. "La politique étrangère de la Turquie." Turkish Yearbook of International Relations, 1964, pp. 1–12.
 Black, Joseph E., and Kenneth W. Thompson (eds.). Foreign Policies in a World of Change. New York: Harper & Row, 1963. With a contribution by Nuri Eren, "The Foreign Policy of Turkey."
 Danforth, Nicholas. 2021. The Remaking of Republican Turkey: Memory and Modernity since the Fall of the Ottoman Empire. Cambridge University Press.
Deshocquets, Claude. "La Turquie de 1960 et la stratégie globale." Revue de Defense Nationale, 17 (1961), pp. 222–236.
 Dodd, Clement H., ed. Turkish Foreign Policy: New Prospects. Huntingdon, United Kingdom: Eothen Press, 1992.
 Hale, William. Turkish Foreign Policy Since 1774 (Routledge, 2012).
 Hartmann, Hans Walter. Die auswärtige Politik der Türkei, pp. 923–940. Zurich: Leemann & Co., 1999.
 Karpat, Kemal H. (ed.), Turkey's Foreign Policy in Transition (Leiden: E. J. Brill, 1975).
 Kirisci, Kemal and Rubin, Barry (eds.), Turkey in World Politics: An Emerging Multiregional Power (London: Lynne Rienner, 2001).
 Robins, Philip, "Turkish Foreign Policy Under Erbakan," Survival, 39.2 (Summer 1997).
 Rouleau, Eric. "The Challenges to Turkey," Foreign Affairs, 72, No. 5, November–December 1993, pp. 110–126.

Foreign relations (2002–present)
 Duran, Burhanettin, "JDP and Foreign Policy as an Agent of Transformation," in Yavuz, H.M. (ed.), The Emergence of a New Turkey: Democracy and the AK Party (Salt Lake City: University of Utah Press, 2006).
 Dursun-Özkanca, Ova. 2019. Turkey–West Relations: The Politics of Intra-Alliance Opposition. Cambridge University Press.
 Hale, William. Turkish Foreign Policy Since 1774 (Routledge, 2012).
 Kirisci, Kemal, "Turkey's Foreign Policy in Turbulent Times," Chaillot Paper 92 (Paris, EUISS, 2006).
 Kutlay, Mustafa, "Economy as the 'Practical Hand' of 'New Turkish Foreign Policy': A Political Economy Explanation," Insight Turkey, 13.1 (2011).
 Renda, Kadri Kaan, "Turkey's Neighborhood Policy: An Emerging Complex Interdependence?" Insight Turkey, 13.1 (2011).
 Sandole, Dennis J.D., "Turkey's Unique Role in Nipping in the Bud the 'Clash of Civilizations'," International Politics'', 46.5 (September 2009).
 Schenkkan, Nate, Testimony Before the Subcommittee on Europe, Eurasia and Emerging Threats, Foreign Affairs Committee, United States House of Representatives, Hearings on "The Future of Turkish Democracy," 15 July 2014.

External links
 Ministry of Foreign Affairs of Turkey
 Örmeci, Ozan & Işıksal, Hüseyin (2015), Turkish Foreign Policy in the New Millennium, Frankfurt am Main: Peter Lang

 
Euromediterranean Partnership